The EMU600 series is a series of electric multiple unit passenger trains operated by Taiwan Railways Administration (TRA). The trains are built as local trains and are used throughout the island’s rail network.

History 
With the electrification of the Yilan line and the North-link line in the early 2000s, the TRA faced a shortage of electric passenger trains. Therefore, in 1999, the TRA contracted South Korean manufacturer KOROS to build 56 more cars divided into 14 trainsets. The first two trainsets were shipped to Taiwan on October 3, 2000. When KOROS merged with other companies in 2002 to form Hyundai Rotem, the new company continued to produce the trains. The last two trainsets (numbered 613 and 614) were produced in Taiwan by Tang Eng Iron Works. The trains entered service on 11 October 2002.

Features 
The EMU600 series runs in four-car units in the following order: a motorized car with the cab (EMC), an unmotorized car with a pantograph (EP), an unmotorized car (ET), and a motorized car (EM). On the outside, the EMU600 series shares many similarities with the EMU500 series, which was manufactured six years earlier. Both exteriors are made of stainless steel and have very similar liveries. However, unlike its predecessor, the traction system on the EMU600 series uses a insulated-gate bipolar transistor (IGBT) made by Toshiba instead of a gate turn-off thyristor (GTO) on the EMU500 series. 

Similar to other local trains, the EMU600 series is fitted with cloth seats running parallel to the center aisle. In 2010, an LED display was installed above the doors. The cars originally had one step at each door; this was removed beginning in 2017 by raising platforms and remodeling the interior to turn the trains into a low floor layout for accessibility. As of November 2019, 70% of EMU600 trains have been reconfigured.

References

Electric multiple units of Taiwan
Hyundai Rotem multiple units
25 kV AC multiple units